The 1949 British Grand Prix was a Grand Prix motor race which was held at Silverstone on 14 May 1949. The race was won by Emmanuel de Graffenried driving a Maserati 4CLT.

Background

The 1949 Grand Prix was held just seven months after the 1948 event on a substantially modified layout. For 1949 the layout used perimeter roads only, no longer running down the runways. The layout was much the same as that used until 1973 with the exception of a tight chicane at what became Club corner in order to ensure cars were tested at both high and low speeds.

Also new for 1949 was the RAC being granted Grande Epreuve status for their race, officially adopting the title of British Grand Prix.

Entries
Although a large entry was attracted, in spite of the increased importance placed on the event the entry did not include any true factory entries.

Practice and qualifying
Practice began on the Thursday before the race, although not all competitors arrived, some having travelled from the 1949 Roussillon Grand Prix in Perignan. Peter Walker set the fastest time on Thursday in 2 minutes 13.2. Luigi Villoresi was still tired, having arrived directly from Perignon, but was able to set second fastest time in 2 minutes 14.4, followed by Tony Rolt (2 minutes 15.8) and Cuth Harrison (2 minutes 16.4).

Times improved the following day as more of the international drivers had arrived. Villoresi would improve on his Thursday time to be fastest of all in 2 minutes 9.8, followed by Bira, who had also arrived from Perignan, in 2 minutes 10.2. The next fastest times set on Friday were by Emmanuel de Graffenried (2 minutes 13.6) and Bob Gerard (2 minutes 14.4).

The starting grid was arranged in  rows of five, then four, then five, and so on.

Classification

Race
Bira made the best start in his Maserati, leading Villoresi's similar car by a clear two lengths at the first corner, followed closely by two more Maseratis, driven by de Graffenried, and by Reg Parnell taking advantage of starting directly behind the fastest drivers. Fifth was the ERA of Gerard. Villoresi overtook Bira for the lead on the third lap, as the pair pulled away from the rest of the field.

On lap 24, Bira regained the lead, and Villoresi began slowing, stopping for fuel at the end of lap 27 and dropping to fourth place behind Parnell moving into second place just slightly ahead of de Graffenried. Behind Villoresi was the Alta of George Abecassis in fifth and another Maserati, that of Fred Ashmore, in sixth. After thirty laps Bira had lapped every car outside of the top four. Not long after this Abecassis lost most of his exhaust pipe but continued on unfazed, while at the same time Villoresi stopped again, this time retiring with a loss of oil pressure.

Bira began suffering from brake fade, allowing Parnell to slowly close the gap but after 40 laps they were still around 40 seconds apart, with de Graffenried now around 20 seconds behind Parnell, followed now by Gerard and the Talbot-Lago of Philippe Étancelin. On his 48th lap Bira was unable to slow for the Club chicane, colliding with the straw bales and a barrel, damaging his suspension too much to continue, giving the lead to Parnell. At the halfway point (50 laps), Parnell lead de Graffenried by 23.6 seconds, followed by Gerard in third from Billy Cotton (who had taken over David Hampshire's ERA), and the Talbot-Lagos of Louis Rosier and Étancelin.

Parnell did not lead for long, however, as his axle oil plug popped out, losing him the lead. He would stop three more times over the next few laps and eventually retired after 69 laps due to a broken rear axle. So then after 60 laps the order was de Graffenried over three minutes ahead of Gerard, the soon to retire Parnell, Cotton, the two Talbot-Lagos, Ashmore and the Alta of Abecassis back up to seventh after losing a significant amount of time with carburettor trouble. Soon after Rosier took his Talbot-Lago into fourth place ahead of Cotton.

For the final 30 laps Gerard began to catch de Graffenried but was still some way back. His progress was helped by de Graffenried making a second stop for fuel on lap 85, but only managed to come within a minute of leading. So then de Graffenried won the race in a time of nearly four hours, 65 seconds ahead of Gerard who was himself a lap clear of third placed Rosier, the only driver to complete the race without stopping for fuel.

Classification

References

British Grand Prix
British
Grand Prix
British Grand Prix